Elissavet Chantzi (or Elisabet Chantzi; born 12 April 1977) is a track and road cyclist from Greece. Between 2006 and 2012 she became national champion in the women's time trial. She represented her nation at the 2007 UCI Road World Championships in the women's time trial and on the track at the 2010 UCI Track Cycling World Championships.

References

External links
 profile at Procyclingstats.com

1977 births
Greek female cyclists
Living people
Place of birth missing (living people)